Rafael Ferreiro (born October 22, 1979) is the current head coach of the Miami Dade FC.

Player
Ferreiro played at the youth ranks of United States Men's National Soccer Team. Ferreiro was a three-time NAIA All-American while playing at Nova Southeastern University.

Coach
Ferreiro began his coaching career as the head coach at Cardinal Gibbons High School in 2006 where he was inducted in the Hall of Fame Coach in 2014. He also worked as the assistant coach at Barry University from 2010 to 2013.

In May 2015, he was named head coach of Miami Dade FC.

Ferreira made his debut with Miami Dade FC in the American Premier Soccer League in 2015.

Miami Dade FC
American Premier Soccer League - 2016 Regular Season Champions
 American Premier Soccer League - 2017 Regular Season Champions
 American Premier Soccer League - 2017 APSL Champions

References

1986 births
Living people
American soccer coaches
American soccer players
Association football midfielders
Barry Buccaneers coaches